Gone with the Wind most often refers to either:
 Gone with the Wind (novel), a 1936 novel by Margaret Mitchell
 Gone with the Wind (film), the 1939 adaptation of the novel
Gone with the Wind may also refer to:

Music
 Gone with the Wind (album), a 1959 album by The Dave Brubeck Quartet
 "Gone with the Wind" (song), a popular song by Allie Wrubel and Herb Magidson released in 1937
 "Gone with the Wind", a song by Architects from the 2016 album All Our Gods Have Abandoned Us
 "Gone with the Wind", a song by Blackmore's Night from the 1999 album Under a Violet Moon
 "Gone with the Wind", a song by Robin Gibb from the 1985 album Walls Have Eyes
 "Gone with the Wind", a song by Techno Twins from the 1982 album Technostalgia
 "Gone with the Wind", a song by Vanessa Hudgens from the 2008 album Identified

Theater 

Gone with the Wind (musical), a 2008 musical based on the novel
 Scarlett (musical), retitled Gone with the Wind for the 1972 London production

Other uses
 "Gone with the Wind", an episode of The Cleveland Show (season 1)

See also

 Scarlett (Ripley novel), a 1991 novel by Alexandra Ripley written as a sequel to Gone with the Wind
 Scarlett (miniseries), based loosely on the novel
 Autant en emporte le vent, a 2003 French musical based on the novel
 Rhett Butler's People, a 2007 novel by Donald McCaig written as a sequel to Gone with the Wind from the perspective of Rhett Butler